News is a quarterly publication of the National Library Service for the Blind and Physically Handicapped (NLS), part of the U.S. Library of Congress, and is associated with libraries serving blind and physically disabled readers, and their cooperating agencies.  This serial publication includes articles of interest to librarians and others, and covers a broad range of topics including libraries and technology. The primary focus of the articles is on accessibility to blind and physically disabled readers.

As early as 1958, issues of the Division for the Blind Newsletter were published by what was then called the Library of Congress Division for the Blind and Physically Handicapped. Around 1967, the name became DBPH News. The DBPH News became a regular bimonthly publication at the end of the 1960s and gained formal volume numbers with the January/February 1970 issue, . It became quarterly starting with the January–March 1982 issue.

Issues from 1995 (volume 26) on are available online at the official website or as http://purl.access.gpo.gov/GPO/LPS3139

References

External links
 NLS News Home — official site, with electronic copies back to 1995; also permanently linked from http://purl.access.gpo.gov/GPO/LPS3139

1958 establishments in Washington, D.C.
Magazines established in 1958
Accessibility
Quarterly magazines published in the United States
Library of Congress
Library science magazines
Newsletters
Magazines published in Washington, D.C.